The Men's discus throw event took place on July 7, 2011, at the Kobe Universiade Memorial Stadium.

Medalists

Records

Results

Final
The gold medal of the event was won by the Asian record holder Ehsan Haddadi of Iran, with the best throw of 62.27 m.

References

2011 Asian Athletics Championships
Discus throw at the Asian Athletics Championships